The women's long jump event at the 2011 European Athletics Indoor Championships was held at March 5, 2011 at 11:30 (qualification) and March 6, 14:50 (final) local time.

Records

Results

Qualification
Qualifying perf. 6.60 (Q) or 8 best performers (q) advanced to the Final
The qualification was held at 11:30.

Final

References 

Long jump at the European Athletics Indoor Championships
Long Jump W
2011 in women's athletics